The Uruguayan Championship 1915 was the 15th season of Uruguay's top-flight football league.

Overview
The tournament consisted of a two-wheel championship of all against all. It involved ten teams, and the champion was Nacional.

Club Atlético Defensor first appeared in this season. Afterwards, Bristol and Independencia were relegated.

Teams

League standings

References
Uruguay - List of final tables (RSSSF)

Uruguayan Primera División seasons
Uru
1